Donald Lehe was a Republican member of the Indiana House of Representatives, representing the 25th District since 2012 and the 15th district from 2002 to 2012. In 2006, Lehe retained his seat, garnering only 26 votes more than his challenger. Lehe chose to retire and not run for re-election in 2022.

References

External links
 Representative Donald Lehe
 

Living people
Republican Party members of the Indiana House of Representatives
21st-century American politicians
Year of birth missing (living people)
Purdue University alumni